Zaire is one of the 18 provinces of Angola.  It occupies  in the north west of the country and had a population of 594,428 inhabitants in 2014. It is bordered on the west by the Atlantic Ocean, on the north by the Democratic Republic of Congo, on the east by the Uíge Province, and on the south by the Bengo Province.

History
The Kongo people (or Bakongo) occupied the valley of the Congo (or Zaire) River in the mid-thirteenth century, and formed the Kingdom of Kongo, which existed from 1390 until 1891 as an independent state, and until 1914 as a vassal state of the Kingdom of Portugal. In 1914, the Kongo monarchy was abolished after Portuguese suppression of several revolts. From 1885, Portuguese Angola included the District of Congo, which was split in 1919 into the districts of Cabinda and Zaire, respectively north and south of the Congo/Zaire River.

During the 1961–1974 Angolan War of Independence, a large fraction of the Bakongo fled to the Republic of Zaire. Many of these refugees and their offspring returned after the Alvor Agreement recognised Angolan independence.

Monuments
Historical and cultural monuments include:
 Kulumbimbi Museum: Ancient King's House in M'Banza Congo.
 Yala Nkuw (Tree of force or blood): Place where the king of Kongo executed verdicts.
 Ruins of the Cathedral: First Church of Angola, built in 1491. It was visited by Pope John Paul II.
 Rico and Pinda Ports: They served as ports for exportation of slaves.
 Ponta do Padrão: First port that served the Portuguese in 1482 for the discovery of Angola by Diogo Cão.

Capital

M'Banza Congo (formerly São Salvador do Congo) is the provincial capital.

Municipalities
The province of Cuanza Norte contains six municipalities:

 Cuimba
 M'Banza Congo
 Nóqui
 N'zeto
 Soyo
 Tomboco

Communes
The province of Cuanza Norte contains the following communes; sorted by their respective municipalities:

 Cuimba Municipality: – Buela, Cuimba, Luvaca, Serra da Canda (Kanda)
 M'Banza Congo Municipality: – Caluca, Kiende (Quiende), Luvu, Madimba, M'Banza Kongo, Nkalambata (Calambata)
 Nóqui Municipality: – Lufico, Mpala Lulendo, Nóqui
 N'Zeto Municipality: – Kindeji (Quindeje), Loge (Kibala Norte or Loge-Kibala, Mussera, N'Zeto
 Soyo Municipality: – Kelo (Quêlo), Mangue Grande, Pedra de Feitiço, Soyo, Sumba
 Tomboco Municipality: – Kiximba (Quinsimba), Kinzau (Quinzau), Tomboco

Geography
Zaire Province has two seasons: from November to May, the rainy season; and from June to October, the dry season. The predominant types of weather in the province are tropical wet climate and semi-arid. The temperature in the area varies between 24 °C and 26 °C.

Fauna and Flora of the region are very varied, with savannah and dense rainforests. The main rivers of Zaire Province are: Congo, Mbridge, Lufunde, Zadi, Cuilo and Buenga.

Demography

The national language spoken in the province is Kikongo and the predominant ethnic group in the region is Bakongo.

According to preliminary data from the General Census of Population and Housing conducted in May 2014, Zaire Province has currently 567,225 inhabitants, corresponding to 2.3 percent of the Angolan population. In this province, reside 285,333 women and 281,892 men, with 26.1% of the population living in rural areas and the majority, 73.9%, living in urban areas.

Politics

The Zaire Provincial Government consists of Governor José Joana André, and 3 Deputy Governors. Ângela Maria Botelho de Carvalho Diogo is the Deputy Governor for the area of Technical Services and Infrastructures; Alberto Maria Sabino is the Deputy Governor for the Economic Sector; and Rogério Eduardo Zabila is the Deputy Governor for Political and Social Sector.

Industries 

 Petroleum
 Mining: asphalt, iron, phosphates, lead, zinc
 Agriculture: cashew nuts, cassava, castor oil, citrus fruits, coffee, massambala, palm oil, pineapples, peanuts, rice, soybeans, sweet potatoes
 Cattle farming
 Fishing
 Production of construction materials
 Deposits: gold, silver, diamonds

Transportation

Airports

Zaire Province is served by three airports. Soyo Airport and Mbanza Congo Airport have paved runways and regular flights to Luanda. N'zeto Airport has a grass strip runway and is used for private flights.

Culture

The city celebrations take place on July 25 in M'Banza Congo, and on April 5 in Soyo.

Province typical dishes are sacafolha (made with cassava leaves), dishes made with fresh and dried fish accompanied by bombó funge, and dishes with game meat.

Tourism
Zaire Province has several natural points of interest, namely:
 The Spell Stone in Soyo.
 Musserra Bay,  from N'Zeto: used for bathing and water sports.
 Sirenes Beach in Soyo.
 Beach of the Poor, located in a prime area of Soyo city, on the left bank of the Zaire River.
 Congo River Mouth.
 Mbdrige River Falls in Soyo: used to canoeing and rafting.
 Pululu Channel in Kwanda.
 Zau Evua Caves,  from M'Banza Congo.
 Senga Caves.

List of governors of Zaire

References

Further reading

 Elikia M'Bokolo (2003). África Negra. História das Civilizações, vol. I, Até ao Século XVIII. Lisboa: Vulgata (in Portuguese)
 Elikia M'Bokolo (2007). África Negra. História das Civilizações, vol. II, Do Século XIX aos nossos dias. Lisboa: Colibri (in Portuguese)
 Patrício Batsîkama (2010). [http://www.luvila.com/uploads/AS_ORIGENS_MAYAMBA_MAIO_1_.pdf As origens do Reino do Kongo] . Luanda: Mayamba (in Portuguese)

External links
 Provincial Government of Zaire 
 Province geographical info at geoview.info

 
Provinces of Angola